Abdul Qadir Patel (born 8 August 1968) is a Pakistani politician  who represents Pakistan Peoples Party (PPP) in the National Assembly of Pakistan. He became a youngest parliamentarian at the age of 25. He served as chairman Standing Committee on the Interior in the National Assembly of Pakistan. He elected as MNA in 2018 General elections in Pakistan from newly established NA-248 (Karachi West-I) constituency.

Early life and education
Patel was born in Memon Society Hospital in Lyari Town in a prominent Kutchi family in Karachi on 8 August 1968. He is the eldest child of the former district chairman of Keamari Town, Hussain Patel. He started working at the age of fifteen. He attended K.P.T secondary school in Keamari Town, Karachi, before gaining his higher education from Urdu college. In 1991 he obtained his B.A. degree from Federal Urdu University where he served as president of Sindh People's Youth, a student wing of Pakistan Peoples Party. He married grand daughter of senior parliamentarian Haji Wali Muhammad Jamot.

Political career 
Patel entered politics as a member of the 10th Provincial Assembly of Sindh on 18 October 1993 at the age of twenty five, which was the minimum age required by the election commission of Pakistan, during the by-election for constituency PS-86 Karachi (Lyari Town) when he defeated Ali Mohammad Hingoro who was than member provincial assembly of Sindh and very strong candidate from Pakistan Peoples Party (Shaheed Bhutto) however in election for 11th Provincial Assembly of Sindh he was succeeded by Muhammad Farooq Awan from constituency of  PS 86. Later he was elected to the 13th National Assembly of Pakistan in February 2008 for the NA-239 (Karachi-I) Kemari Town seat in the general election on a Pakistan Peoples Party ticket after defeating than member national assembly Hakim Qari Gul Rahman of Muttahida Majlis-e-Amal. 
 
He appears on political talk shows in Pakistan as a representative of the Pakistan Peoples Party. He has been associated with different departments and ministries within the Government of Pakistan such as the Department of Ports and Shipping, Foreign Affairs,  Railways, and Labour. He serves as a member of the National Assembly of Pakistan as well as Chairman of the Standing Committee on the Interior. On 3 June 2012 he was appointed as President of the Karachi division of the Pakistan Peoples Party and as political adviser to President Asif Ali Zardari.

Patel took oath as federal Minister for Ministry of National Health Services, Regulation and Coordination 19 April 2022 in newly formed Shahbaz Sharif federal cabinet after no-confidence motion against Imran Khan.

Peacekeeping in Karachi 
Patel has contributed to conflict resolution in Karachi, especially in Kiamari Town and Lyari Town. He lost his close friend and political coordinator Edhi Amin Khaskheli in target killings in Karachi.

Court Trial

Patel had to face the trail for a case that was registered under Karachi registry of the anti-terrorism court (ATC) while he was in London, United Kingdom. He was accused allegedly getting criminals treated at a local hospital which was found to be a false case against him. He came back to Pakistan and surrendered voluntarily by the court of law as he presented himself for self-arrest in July 2016. Patel arrived at ATC and filed a plea, seeking bail in Dr. Asim case. The court approved bail plea and accepted the petition over surety bond of Rs 2 lac till 17 April but bail was rejected and he surrendered himself. He was released on permanent bail after four months of detention in November 2017. His case is under the process of anti-terrorism court (ATC) in Karachi.

Conflict with Pakistan Peoples Party leadership 

He tendered his resignation from the post of president Karachi division and set himself out of media attention for several months due to conflict with the higher leadership of Pakistan Peoples Party. However, after five months his conflicts with higher leadership were resolved and he had a meeting with Chairman PPP Bilawal Bhutto Zardari in April 2018.

General elections 2018 

He secured 35076 votes from newly established NA-248 (Karachi West-I) constituency in 2018 General elections in Pakistan representing Pakistan Peoples Party and defeated Sardar Aziz of Pakistan Tehreek-e-Insaf by a narrow margin . He became member of 15th National Assembly of Pakistan on 13 August 2018.

See also

Pakistan Peoples Party
Bilawal Bhutto Zardari
Asim Hussain

References

External links
Qadir Patel Official YouTube Channel
Qadir Patel Facebook

More Reading
 List of members of the 15th National Assembly of Pakistan

1968 births
Living people
Pakistani people of Gujarati descent
Politicians from Karachi
People from Lyari Town
Pakistani MNAs 2018–2023